Begaly (Begälı, بەگالى; , Begaly) is a town in Aktobe Region, west Kazakhstan.

References

Aktobe Region
Populated places in Kazakhstan